Jorge Sarria (born 13 May 1915, date of death unknown) was a Peruvian fencer. He competed in the individual sabre event at the 1948 Summer Olympics.

References

External links
 

1915 births
Year of death missing
Peruvian male sabre fencers
Olympic fencers of Peru
Fencers at the 1948 Summer Olympics